Siete is the fifth studio album of Carlos Varela, released in 2003.

Track listing
"Échate a correr" - 4:26
"Callejón sin luz" - 4:33
"Estás" - 4:35
"Dudas" - 5:24
"Colgando del cielo" - 5:20
"Delicadeza" - 2:34
"Siete" - 4:38
"Como un pez sin el mar" - 4:49
"El humo del tren" - 3:03
"25 mil mentiras sobre la verdad" - 4:34
"Mi fe" - 3:45
"Detrás del cristal" - 3:57

External links

Carlos Varela Official site

2003 albums
Carlos Varela albums